The following is a list of stadiums in South Africa, ordered by capacity. Currently all stadiums in South Africa with a capacity of 10,000 or more are included.

See also
List of African stadiums by capacity
List of Free State football teams

References

South Africa